Jameer Lamar Nelson Sr. (born February 9, 1982) is an American former professional basketball player who serves as assistant general manager for the Delaware Blue Coats of the NBA G League. He played college basketball for the Saint Joseph's Hawks, where he was named national college player of the year in 2004. Drafted 20th overall in the 2004 NBA draft, Nelson spent the first ten years of his NBA career with the Orlando Magic. In 2009, he was named an All-Star and made an appearance in the NBA Finals with the Magic. He has also played for the Dallas Mavericks, Boston Celtics, Denver Nuggets, New Orleans Pelicans and Detroit Pistons.

High school career
Nelson attended Chester High School in Chester, Pennsylvania and was a letterman in basketball. In 2000, he helped lead his team to the PIAA AAAA State championship.

College career
Nelson began his play at Saint Joseph's University in the 2000–01 season. He had a breakout freshman season in which he was named unanimous National Freshman of the Year. During his junior season in 2002–03, he averaged 19.7 points per game, 5.1 rebounds per game, and 4.7 assists per game. He declared for the 2003 NBA draft, but later decided to remain for his senior season.

Nelson led the Saint Joseph's Hawks to a 27–0 regular season record in 2003–04. The Hawks' first loss came in the Atlantic 10 tournament to Xavier. Nelson and junior guard Delonte West formed what was largely considered the nation's best backcourt, helping the Hawks earn a #1 seed in the NCAA tournament. They advanced to the Elite Eight and were within seconds of the Final Four before Oklahoma State Cowboys' John Lucas III hit a three-pointer with only a few seconds remaining (after the make, Nelson dribbled up the court and had a chance to tie the game, but his 15-foot shot fell short). Saint Joseph's finished with a 30–2 record, the best in the university's history. Nelson averaged 20.6 points, 5.3 assists, and 2.9 steals per game. He received the Lowe's Senior CLASS Award his final year, recognizing him as the nation's top senior men's basketball player. He left the Hawks as the best player in the program's history, as its all-time leader in scoring (2,094 points), assists (714), and steals (256). Nelson's number was retired by the university on April 23, 2004.

Because of his extraordinary accomplishments as a senior, Nelson won the 2004 Wooden Award, the 2004 Naismith Award, the 2004 Bob Cousy Award, the Rupp Trophy, the Oscar Robertson Trophy and many more accolades, including being featured on the cover of Sports Illustrated. Nelson was the first Atlantic 10 athlete to be on the cover of the magazine since Mark Macon in 1988.

Professional career

Orlando Magic (2004–2014)

Nelson was selected with the 20th overall pick in the 2004 NBA draft by the Denver Nuggets, and was subsequently traded to the Orlando Magic for a 2005 first-round draft pick. Though many speculated he would be a top 10 pick, he fell to number 20, and the Magic were able to acquire both Nelson and Dwight Howard in the same draft.

As a rookie, Nelson served as the primary backup to the Magic's All-Star point guard Steve Francis. Due to Nelson's impressive play, the Magic moved Francis to shooting guard to make room for Nelson to start at point guard. He was named to the NBA All-Rookie Second Team, and garnered Rookie of the Year consideration.

On February 22, 2006, the Magic dealt Francis to the New York Knicks, paving the way for Nelson to become the long-term starting point guard of Orlando. Nelson's play improved with the mid-season trade of Francis, finishing the season with averages of 14.6 points and 5 assists per game on 48.3% field goal shooting.

The following year, Nelson helped lead the Magic back into the postseason for the first time since 2003. He averaged 14.3 points, 3 rebounds, and 3.3 assists per game during the NBA playoffs, however the Magic were ultimately swept by the top-seeded Detroit Pistons in the first round.

During the 2008 All-Star weekend Slam Dunk Contest, Nelson assisted teammate Dwight Howard on several of his dunks, including the famous Superman dunk. That year, the Magic once again made the playoffs, defeating the Toronto Raptors in the first round before falling to the Pistons in the second round. He averaged 16.2 points, 4.7 assists and 4.1 rebounds per game through the playoffs, helping Orlando to their first playoff series win in 12 years.

Nelson set career highs in points, steals, and shooting percentages during the 2008–09 NBA season. He, along with teammates Dwight Howard and Rashard Lewis, were selected to play in the 2009 NBA All-Star Game. However, a torn labrum in Nelson's right shoulder, a potential season-ending injury, forced him to miss the game. Nelson was averaging 16.7 points per game and 5.4 assists at the time. After a four-month recovery, Nelson returned for the NBA Finals with the controversial decision by Stan Van Gundy for allowing him to play in heavy minutes by limiting Rafer Alston playing, which led the team into demise as the Magic were defeated by the Lakers in five games.

On November 16, Nelson suffered a torn meniscus in his left knee, and had arthroscopic surgery to repair his knee. He returned to action on December 21. Nelson and the Magic again surged into the playoffs with their third straight Southeast Division title, sweeping the Charlotte Bobcats and Atlanta Hawks before falling to the Boston Celtics in six games in the Eastern Conference Finals. He averaged 19 points and 4.8 assists per game in Orlando's 14 playoff games.

On March 18, 2011, Nelson made a game winning buzzer beater against the Denver Nuggets to secure an 85-82 victory for Orlando. On April 10, 2011, Nelson's last-second three-pointer was ruled "no basket", and the Magic lost to the Chicago Bulls 102–99.

Nelson and Dwight Howard, who were close friends since their rookie seasons, were on opposite sides of a trade that sent Rashard Lewis to Washington in exchange for Gilbert Arenas (Nelson considered Lewis one of the team's leaders while Howard reportedly pushed management into making the trade). Their relationship was further strained when Howard publicly stated his desire to play with a superstar point guard like Deron Williams or Chris Paul, and was reportedly the driving force behind the firing of coach Stan Van Gundy. Howard eventually forced a trade to the Lakers in the 2012 offseason. Despite this, Nelson re-signed with the Magic on a three-year deal.

On February 23, 2014, Nelson scored his 8020th point, passing Shaquille O'Neal for fourth place on the Magic's all-time scoring list.

On June 30, 2014, he was waived by the Magic after 10 seasons with the team.

Dallas Mavericks (2014)
On July 24, 2014, Nelson signed a two-year, $5.6 million contract with the Dallas Mavericks. He appeared in 23 games for the Mavericks and averaged 7.3 points and 4.1 assists per game.

Boston Celtics (2014–2015)
On December 18, 2014, Nelson was traded, along with Jae Crowder, Brandan Wright, a 2015 first-round pick, a 2016 second-round pick and a $12.9 million trade exception, to the Boston Celtics in exchange for Rajon Rondo and Dwight Powell. In six games for Boston, Nelson averaged 4.8 points and 5.5 assists per game. In his second game with Boston, Nelson returned to Orlando for the first time since leaving for Dallas as a free agent.

Denver Nuggets (2015–2017)
On January 13, 2015, Nelson was traded to the Denver Nuggets in exchange for Nate Robinson. On June 26, 2015, Nelson opted out of the remaining year of his contract with the Nuggets to become a free agent.

On August 7, 2015, Nelson re-signed with the Nuggets.

On October 18, 2017, Nelson was waived by the Nuggets.

New Orleans Pelicans (2017–2018)
On October 22, 2017, Nelson signed with the New Orleans Pelicans.

Detroit Pistons (2018)
On February 1, 2018, Nelson was traded, along with Ömer Aşık, Tony Allen and a protected first-round pick, to the Chicago Bulls in exchange for Nikola Mirotić and a 2018 second-round pick. In addition, Chicago will have the right to swap its 2021 second-round pick with New Orleans' own 2021 second-round pick. Seven days later, he was traded to the Detroit Pistons in exchange for Willie Reed and future second-round draft considerations.

Executive career
On November 11, 2020, the Delaware Blue Coats of the NBA G League named Nelson as the assistant general manager.

NBA career statistics

Regular season

|-
| style="text-align:left;"|
| style="text-align:left;"|Orlando
| 79 || 21 || 20.4 || .455 || .312 || .682 || 2.4 || 3.0 || 1.0 || .0 || 8.7
|-
| style="text-align:left;"|
| style="text-align:left;"|Orlando
| 62 || 33 || 28.8 || .483 || .424 || .779 || 2.9 || 4.9 || 1.1 || .1 || 14.6
|-
| style="text-align:left;"|
| style="text-align:left;"|Orlando
| 77 || 77 || 30.3 || .430 || .335 || .828 || 3.1 || 4.3 || .9 || .1 || 13.0
|-
| style="text-align:left;"|
| style="text-align:left;"|Orlando
| 69 || 62 || 28.4 || .469 || .416 || .828 || 3.5 || 5.6 || .9 || .1 || 10.9
|-
| style="text-align:left;"|
| style="text-align:left;"|Orlando
| 42 || 42 || 31.2 || .503 || .453 || .887 || 3.5 || 5.4 || 1.2 || .1 || 16.7
|-
| style="text-align:left;"|
| style="text-align:left;"|Orlando
| 65 || 64 || 28.6 || .449 || .381 || .845 || 3.0 || 5.4 || .7 || .0 || 12.6
|-
| style="text-align:left;"|
| style="text-align:left;"|Orlando
| 76 || 76 || 30.5 || .446 || .401 || .802 || 3.0 || 6.0 || 1.0 || .0 || 13.1
|-
| style="text-align:left;"|
| style="text-align:left;"|Orlando
| 57 || 57 || 29.9 || .427 || .377 || .807 || 3.2 || 5.7 || .7 || .1 || 11.9
|-
| style="text-align:left;"|
| style="text-align:left;"|Orlando
| 56 || 56 || 35.3 || .392 || .341 || .873 || 3.7 || 7.4 || 1.3 || .1 || 14.7
|-
| style="text-align:left;"|
| style="text-align:left;"|Orlando
| 68 || 68 || 32.0 || .394 || .348 || .857 || 3.4 || 7.0 || .8 || .1 || 12.1
|-
| style="text-align:left;"|
| style="text-align:left;"|Dallas
| 23 || 23 || 25.4 || .374 || .369 || .875 || 2.7 || 4.1 || .7 || .1 || 7.3
|-
| style="text-align:left;"|
| style="text-align:left;"|Boston
| 6 || 1 || 20.2 || .220 || .200 || .667 || 2.8 || 5.5 || 1.2 || .0 || 4.8
|-
| style="text-align:left;"|
| style="text-align:left;"|Denver
| 34 || 5 || 20.6 || .450 || .354 || .579 || 1.9 || 3.7 || .7 || .1 || 9.6
|-
| style="text-align:left;"|
| style="text-align:left;"|Denver
| 39 || 15 || 26.6 || .368 || .299 || .857 || 2.9 || 4.9 || .6 || .1 || 7.7
|-
| style="text-align:left;"|
| style="text-align:left;"|Denver
| 75 || 39 || 27.3 || .444 || .388 || .714 || 2.6 || 5.1 || .7 || .1 || 9.2
|-
| style="text-align:left;"|
| style="text-align:left;"|New Orleans
| 43 || 0 || 20.9 || .410 || .364 || .765 || 2.2 || 3.6 || .5 || .1 || 5.1
|-
| style="text-align:left;"|
| style="text-align:left;"|Detroit
| 7 || 0 || 16.6 || .282 || .071 || 1.000 || 1.1 || 3.3 || .6 || .1 || 3.7
|- class="sortbottom"
| style="text-align:center;" colspan="2"|Career
| 878 || 640 || 27.9 || .436 || .368 || .810 || 3.0 || 5.1 || .9 || .1 || 11.3

Playoffs

|-
| style="text-align:left;"|2007
| style="text-align:left;"|Orlando
| 4 || 4 || 32.3 || .420 || .357 || .909 || 3.0 || 3.3 || .8 || .0 || 14.3
|-
| style="text-align:left;"|2008
| style="text-align:left;"|Orlando
| 10 || 10 || 33.3 || .504 || .488 || .757 || 4.1 || 4.7 || .3 || .2 || 16.2
|-
| style="text-align:left;"|2009
| style="text-align:left;"|Orlando
| 5 || 0 || 18.0 || .348 || .167 || .500 || 1.4 || 2.8 || .2 || .0 || 3.8
|-
| style="text-align:left;"|2010
| style="text-align:left;"|Orlando
| 14 || 14 || 34.2 || .479 || .393 || .823 || 3.6 || 4.8 || 1.0 || .0 || 19.0
|-
| style="text-align:left;"|2011
| style="text-align:left;"|Orlando
| 6 || 6 || 36.0 || .378 || .231 || .786 || 4.2 || 5.0 || 2.0 || .0 || 13.2
|-
| style="text-align:left;"|2012
| style="text-align:left;"|Orlando
| 5 || 5 || 36.4 || .392 || .320 || .750 || 3.8 || 6.6 || .8 || .2 || 15.6
|- class="sortbottom"
| style="text-align:center;" colspan="2"|Career
| 44 || 39 || 32.5 || .445 || .372 || .792 || 3.5 || 4.6 || .8 || .1 || 15.0

Personal life
On August 30, 2007, Nelson's father, Floyd "Pete" Nelson, was reported missing after disappearing at his Chester tugboat repair shop located along the docks of the Delaware River at Front Street and Highland Avenue. Authorities said no one saw his father fall into the water. Nelson arrived at the search scene the next morning. On September 2, 2007, Floyd Nelson's body was found floating in the Delaware River. His death was ruled accidental.

He has a tattoo on his back that says All Eyes On Me, and another one that says Accomplish Everything Without Fear.

On July 5, 2008, he married long-time girlfriend, Imani Tillery. He has one son from a previous relationship, Jameer Jr., who is a guard for The University of Delaware.

References

External links

 
 

1982 births
Living people
African-American basketball players
All-American college men's basketball players
American men's basketball players
Basketball players from Pennsylvania
Boston Celtics players
Chester High School alumni
Dallas Mavericks players
Denver Nuggets draft picks
Denver Nuggets players
Detroit Pistons players
National Basketball Association All-Stars
New Orleans Pelicans players
Orlando Magic players
Point guards
Saint Joseph's Hawks men's basketball players
Sportspeople from Chester, Pennsylvania
21st-century African-American sportspeople
20th-century African-American people